The Airdrome Nieuport 11 is an American amateur-built aircraft, designed and produced by Airdrome Aeroplanes, of Holden, Missouri. The aircraft is supplied as a kit for amateur construction.

The aircraft is a 7/8 scale replica of the First World War French Nieuport 11 Bebe fighter, a key aircraft in ending the Fokker Scourge. The replica is built from modern materials and powered by modern engines.

Design and development
The Airdrome Nieuport 11 features a "V"-strut sesquiplane layout, a single-seat open cockpit, fixed conventional landing gear and a single engine in tractor configuration.

The aircraft is made from bolted-together aluminum tubing, with its flying surfaces covered in doped aircraft fabric. The kit is made up of twelve sub-kits. The standard engine used is the  four stroke Volkswagen air-cooled engine. Building time from the factory-supplied kit is estimated at 375 hours by the manufacturer.

Operational history
Only one example had been completed by December 2011.

Specifications (Nieuport 11)

See also
Circa Reproductions Nieuport

References

Homebuilt aircraft
Single-engined tractor aircraft
Sesquiplanes